Tuna Festival is an annual festival celebrated in General Santos, Philippines, in the first week of September of every year.

See also
General Santos
South Cotabato
List of Philippine-related topics

References

Festivals in the Philippines
General Santos